Yulieski González Ledesma (born June 20, 1980 in Alquízar, Havana Province, Cuba) is a pitcher for the Cuba national baseball team and Habana of the Cuban National Series.

González played for Cuba at the 2006 World Baseball Classic, where he was 3-0 with a 1.62 ERA.

He also represented Cuba at the 2007 World Port Tournament, where he earned the save in Cuba's 2-0 championship game victory over Chinese Taipei.

Gonzalez also represented Cuba in the 2009 World Baseball Classic.

His Club, the Habana Baseball Team achieve the Cuban Championship from the first time in the 2008-2009 edition, supported by its great pitching staff, conformed by some other great Cuban pitchers such as Yadier Pedroso, Miguel Lahera, Jonder Martinez and Miguel Alfredo Gonzalez.

References

External links
 

1980 births
Living people
Baseball players at the 2011 Pan American Games
Cuban baseball players
2006 World Baseball Classic players
2009 World Baseball Classic players
Vaqueros de la Habana players
Pan American Games bronze medalists for Cuba
Pan American Games medalists in baseball
Central American and Caribbean Games gold medalists for Cuba
Competitors at the 2006 Central American and Caribbean Games
People from Artemisa Province
Central American and Caribbean Games medalists in baseball
Medalists at the 2011 Pan American Games